The Fitzgerald Theater is the oldest active theatre in Saint Paul, Minnesota, and the home of American Public Media's Live from Here (formerly A Prairie Home Companion). It was one of many theaters built by the Shubert Theatre Corporation, and was initially named the Sam S. Shubert Theater. It was designed by the noted Chicago architectural firm of Marshall and Fox, architects of several theaters for the Shuberts. In 1933, it became a movie outlet known as the World Theater. The space was purchased by Minnesota Public Radio in 1980, restored with a stage in 1986 as a site for Prairie Home, and renamed in 1994 after St. Paul native F. Scott Fitzgerald.

On November 4, 2002, the theater was the site of a memorable election-eve debate between United States Senate candidates Norm Coleman (previously mayor of St. Paul) and Walter Mondale (formerly a U.S. Vice President) and moderated by Gary Eichten of MPR and Paul Magers of local television station KARE. Tension was heightened at the time because Mondale stepped in as a candidate at the last minute after the death of Paul Wellstone, who had been running for re-election.

In 2005, the theater was used for filming the Prairie Home Companion movie directed by Robert Altman. While a certain level of realism is added by using the normal venue for the show, the regular equipment was eschewed in favor of sets designed for the movie. Because the theater is a small building, other theaters in the region were also scouted prior to filming, just in case the Fitzgerald was not big enough, but eventually it was determined to be adequate for the film's needs.

In March 2019 Twin Cities venue operator, First Avenue, purchased The Fitzgerald Theater from MPR.

The theater has a theatre organ, made by Wurlitzer.

References

External links

Shubert Theater photos at the Minnesota Historical Society
World Theater photos at the Minnesota Historical Society
The Fitzgerald Theater

Arts organizations based in Saint Paul, Minnesota
Minnesota Public Radio
National Register of Historic Places in Saint Paul, Minnesota
Theatres in Minnesota
Theatres completed in 1910
Theatres on the National Register of Historic Places in Minnesota
Beaux-Arts architecture in Minnesota
Public venues with a theatre organ
1910 establishments in Minnesota